Kopaniny may refer to the following places:
Kopaniny, Gmina Lututów in Łódź Voivodeship (central Poland)
Kopaniny, Gmina Sokolniki in Łódź Voivodeship (central Poland)
Kopaniny, Lublin Voivodeship (east Poland)
Kopaniny, Świętokrzyskie Voivodeship (south-central Poland)
Kopaniny, Masovian Voivodeship (east-central Poland)
Kopaniny, Częstochowa County in Silesian Voivodeship (south Poland)
Kopaniny, Zawiercie County in Silesian Voivodeship (south Poland)
Kopaniny, West Pomeranian Voivodeship (north-west Poland)